The system of Orders, decorations, and medals of South Vietnam came into being with the establishment of the National Order of Vietnam in 1950. Established by Bảo Đại, the head of state of the State of Vietnam, the order was the highest award of the state for both civilians and military personnel. This level of precedence continued under the government of South Vietnam. Lower ranking awards for both the military and civilians were subsequently established. The systems of civilian and military awards had their own order of precedence.

National Order
National Order of Vietnam
 Knight Grand Cross
 Grand Officer
 Commander
 Officer
 Knight

Military awards and decorations
Military awards are worn in the following order:
 Military Merit Medal
Distinguished Service Order
 Army First Class
 Army Second Class
 Air Force First Class
 Air Force Second Class
 Navy First Class
 Navy Second Class
 Meritorious Service Medal
 Army Meritorious Service Medal
 Air Force Meritorious Service Medal
 Navy Meritorious Service Medal
 Special Service Medal
Gallantry Cross
 Gallantry Cross with Palm (cited at the Armed Forces level)
 Gallantry Cross with Gold Star (cited at the Corps level)
 Gallantry Cross with Silver Star (cited at the Division level)
 Gallantry Cross with Bronze Star (cited at the Regiment or Brigade level)
 Gallantry Cross Unit Award
Air Gallantry Cross
 Gold Wing Ribbon
 Silver Wing Ribbon
 Bronze Wing Ribbon
Navy Gallantry Cross
 Gold Anchor Ribbon
 Silver Anchor Ribbon
 Bronze Anchor Ribbon
 Hazardous Service Medal
 Life Saving Medal
 Loyalty Medal
 Wound Medal
Armed Forces Honor Medal
 First class
 Second class
Leadership Medal
 Armed Forces level
 Corps level
 Division level
 Brigade level
 Regiment level
 Battalion level
 Company level
Staff Service Medal
 First class
 Second class
Technical Service Medal
 First class
 Second class
Training Service Medal
 First class
 Second class
Civil Actions Medal
 First class
 Second class
 Unit Citation
Good Conduct Medal
 First class
 Second class
 Third class
 Fourth class
 Fifth class
 Vietnam Campaign Medal
Military Service Medal
 First class
 Second class
 Third class
 Fourth class
 Fifth class
Air Service Medal
 First class
 Second class
 Third class
 Honor class
Navy Service Medal
 First class
 Second class
 Third class
 Honor class
 Medal for Campaigns Outside the Frontier
 Air Force Northern Expeditionary Medal

Civilian awards and decorations
Civilian awards are worn in the following order:
Kim Khanh Decoration
 Exceptional class
 First class
 Second class
 Third class
Chuong My Medal
 First class
 Second class
Administrative Service Medal
 First class
 Second class
Dedicated Service Medal
 First class
 Second class
Justice Medal
 First class
 Second class
Cultural and Educational Service Medal
 First class
 Second class
Public Health Service Medal
 First class
 Second class
Social Service Medal
 First class
 Second class
Economic Service Medal
 First class
 Second class
Finance Service Medal
 First class
 Second class
Psychological Warfare Medal
 First class
 Second class
Agricultural Service Medal
 First class
 Second class
Public Works, Communication and Transportation Service Medal
 First class
 Second class
Labor Medal
 First class
 Second class
 Third class 
 Rural Revolutionary Development Medal
Ethnic Development Medal
 First class
 Second class
Veterans Medal
 First class
 Second class
Police Merit Medal
 First class
 Second class
 Third class
 Unit Citation
Police Honor Medal
 First class
 Second class
 Third class
 Unit Citation
People's Self-Defense Medal
 First class
 Second class
Youth and Sports Service medal
 First class
 Second class
 Hamlet Common Defense Medal

Other awards
These awards are not listed in the order of precedence for military or civilian awards:
 Unity Medal
 Medal of Sacrifice
 Vietnam Presidential Unit Citation

Foreign recipients
Many of the South Vietnamese military awards and decorations were awarded to members of foreign military forces fighting with and advising the South Vietnamese military. Some civilian awards were also presented, but their acceptance and wear was limited by the recipients' governments.

References